The Division of Darling was an Australian electoral division in the state of New South Wales. The division was proclaimed in 1900, and was one of the original 65 divisions to be contested at the first federal election. From 1901 until 1922 it was based on Bourke, Cobar, Nyngan, Coonamble and Gilgandra. From 1906, it also included Dubbo. The 1922 redistribution increased the number of voters in some rural electorates and as a result the division of Barrier was abolished with most of its population, including the large mining town of Broken Hill, Wentworth and Balranald, was absorbed by Darling along with Hay from Riverina. Dubbo was transferred to Gwydir in 1922 but returned to Darling in 1934. In 1948, Dubbo, Gilgandra and Coonamble were transferred to the new division of Lawson and Hay and Balranald were transferred to Riverina. In 1955 Coonamble returned to Darling. In 1977 it was abolished with Broken Hill and Wentworth going to Riverina and Bourke, Cobar, Nyngan and Coonamble going to Gwydir.

Darling was named for the Darling River. It was a safe seat for the Australian Labor Party, which held it for all but seven months of its history. It was one of the few country seats where Labor usually did well.

Its most prominent member was William Spence, one of the founders of the Labor Party and the Australian Workers' Union. Spence was also the only non-Labor member ever to hold the seat, having left the party in the 1916 split. He ultimately joined the Nationalist Party, only to lose the seat in 1917.

Members

Election results

References

1901 establishments in Australia
Constituencies established in 1901
1977 disestablishments in Australia
Constituencies disestablished in 1977
Darling